Palenstein is a RandstadRail station in Zoetermeer, the Netherlands.

History

The station opened, as a railway station, on 22 May 1977 as part of the Zoetermeerlijn, operating Zoetermeer Stadslijn services. The train station closed on 3 June 2006 and reopened as a RandstadRail station on 29 October 2006 for the HTM tram services (4), and on 20 October 2007 for tram service 3.

The station features 2 platforms. These platforms are low, and the same level as the tram doors, therefore making it step free.

Train services
The following services currently call at Palenstein:

Bus service
 177 (Gouda - Waddinxveen - Zevenhuizen - Moerkapelle - Kruisweg - Zoetermeer) - operated by Arrivva
 577 (Gouda - Waddinxveen - Zevenhuizen - Moerkapelle - Kruisweg - Zoetermeer) - operated by Arrivva

Gallery

Railway stations opened in 1977
RandstadRail stations in Zoetermeer